Three Fried Stuffed Treasures  is a traditional street food popular in Hong Kong, Macau and parts of Canton.It is a dish in which vegetables and other foods are stuffed with marinated dace fish paste. and Chinese red sausage

Name 
The name of Three Fried Stuffed Treasures originates from its presentation. Dace fish paste is stuffed into hollowed vegetables and other food such as sausages and tofu. The items are as full as treasures and are sold in a set of three.

Taste 
Soy sauce or worcestershire sauce can be served with the Three Fried Stuffed Treasures. Chilli oil can also be optionally matched with the dish. The dish is rich in savouriness.

Recipe 
Dace fish is smashed into a paste. The dace fish paste is flavoured with preserved mandarin peel, cilantro, green onion, and other seasonings like white pepper and salt. It is common for flour to be added into the paste to reduce the cost of fish. Vegetables such as aubergine and bell pepper are sliced and the centre is scooped out and emptied. The fish paste is stuffed into the emptied vegetables. The fish paste is sometimes stuffed into tofu. They are fried on iron griddles and are usually served in polystyrene foam containers when ordered from a cha chan teng or a street restaurant/vendor.

See also 

 Hong Kong Street Food

References 

Hong Kong cuisine
Macau cuisine